Brandon Colliery railway station served the village of Brandon, County Durham, England from 1861 to 1964 on the Durham to Bishop Auckland Line.

History 
The station opened as Brandon Siding in July 1861 by the North Eastern Railway. It was situated on the west side of Station Road. The station's name was changed to Brandon Colliery after a full service was introduced on 1 March 1878. The station gets its name from the nearby Brandon Colliery which closed in 1968. The station itself closed to passengers on 4 May 1964 and to goods traffic on 10 August 1964.

References

External links 

Disused railway stations in County Durham
Former North Eastern Railway (UK) stations
Railway stations in Great Britain opened in 1861
Railway stations in Great Britain closed in 1964
1861 establishments in England
1964 disestablishments in England
Beeching closures in England